The Oregon Electric Railway (OE) was an interurban railroad line in the U.S. state of Oregon that linked Portland to Eugene. Service from Portland to Salem began in January 1908.  The Spokane, Portland and Seattle Railway purchased the system in 1910, and extended service to Eugene in 1912. Regular passenger service in the Willamette Valley ended in May 1933. Freight operations continued and the railway survived into the 1990s, ultimately as a Burlington Northern feeder. Operation as an electric railroad ended July 10, 1945.

The tracks run parallel to the main modern Union Pacific line between Portland and Eugene, used for freight and passenger service. The OE line is to the west, closely following the Willamette River. In the 2000s, the line has been under consideration as an alternative for Amtrak's Cascades and Coast Starlight passenger lines. Removing passenger service from the clogged Union Pacific track would improve the timeliness of the trains, permit higher capacity, and allow higher-speed travel, peaking at 110 MPH.

Burlington Northern operated the last freight train on the Portland-Beaverton segment of this mainline on December 31, 1994, in preparation for the construction of Westside MAX, part of the TriMet light rail system.

The right-of-way between Portland and Tigard has since been abandoned.  From the north bank depot, it followed 10th Avenue, Salmon Street, and West Bank of the Willamette River.  Portions of the right-of-way between the Southwest Waterfront and Multnomah Boulevard are currently under Interstate 5.

Stations

Main line
In order from north to south

Portland North Bank Depot
10th & Stark
10th & Morrison
5th & Salmon
2nd & Salmon
Front & Jefferson
View Point
Fulton Park
Capitol Hill
Ryan Place
Multnomah
Shahapta
Maplewood
Barstow
Garden Home
branch to Forest Grove
Nesmith
Metzger
Greenburg
Tigard
Bonita
Durham
Tualatin
branch to McMinnville
Nasoma
Tonquin
Mulloy
Wilsonville
Prahl
Butteville
Fargo
Donald
Fellers
Broadacres
West Woodburn
spur to Woodburn
Saint Louis
Concomly
Waconda
Chemeketa (now Hopmere)
Quinaby
Chemawa
Claxtar
Deaf School
Highland
Salem
 Melas
 Livesley
 East Independence
Orville
Sidney
Talbot
Dever
Conser
Albany
Pirtle
Gray
spur to Corvallis
Oakville
Fayetteville
Potter
Tulsa
Nixon
Cartney
Harrisburg
Junction City
 Milorn
 Meadow View
 Aubrey
 Enid
 Lasen
Eugene

United Railways line
In order from west to east

Wilkesboro
North Plains
Lincoln
Helvetia
Falkenberg
Burlington
Linnton

Forest Grove line 
In order from west to east

Forest Grove
Cornelius
Hillsboro
Orenco
Quatama
Elmonica
Beaverton
Whitford
Garden Home

Remnants

The former Oregon Electric line from Tigard to Eugene is now operated by the Portland & Western Railroad.  BN donated the track from Tigard to Quinaby (a farming community north of Keizer) to the State of Oregon and sold the track to the Portland & Western.  South of Quinaby, the line is still owned by BN successor BNSF and leased to P&W for operation.
 The OE branch between Hillsboro and Beaverton is now part of the MAX Blue Line
Passenger service is again available on the segment from Tigard to Wilsonville as part of the Westside Express Service (WES) commuter rail line.  WES service continues north of Tigard to Beaverton using a former Southern Pacific track that the OE had used since the mid-1930s when its own route north of Tigard to downtown Portland was abandoned.  The OE used to join with the ex-Southern Pacific track at Greton, located in the northern part of Tigard near the intersection of S.W. North Dakota Street and S.W. Tiedeman Avenue.  Today, the original OE track ends and joins the former SP line southeast of S.W. Hall Boulevard.  The parking lot of the current WES station in downtown Tigard is where the OE tracks used to lie; the abandoned right-of-way is still plainly visible north of downtown Tigard.
The former station in Eugene had been reused and housed the Oregon Electric Station restaurant.
The Albany station is now a pizza parlor.
The Multnomah depot was located at the current site of the John's Market parking lot, on the northwest corner of SW 35th and Multnomah Blvd. The adjacent 1913 Nelson Thomas Building, characterized as "streetcar era commercial" architecture, still stands.
The North Bank Depot in Portland was the northern terminal for the OE from 1912 to 1931. Used also as a warehouse, the building (and a matching one across the street) was preserved and converted into condominiums in the 1990s.
The site of the Tigard station is now occupied by the Tigard Chamber of Commerce.
The former Springfield Southern Pacific station was leased to Oregon Electric for a brief period. Is now a museum. It has an authentic semaphore signal and baggage car outside.
Several of the railway's electric substations still exist, including those at Tonquin and Waconda.

See also
 Red Electric – a competing interurban service of the Southern Pacific Railroad in the Willamette Valley
 Oregon Electric Railway Historical Society

References

Further reading
 (May 1995), "Freight out, light rail in", Trains Magazine, p. 24.
The Spokane, Portland and Seattle, by Charles and Dorothy Wood (Seattle, Washington: Superior Press), 1974
Railroad Signatures across the Pacific Northwest, by Carlos A. Schwantes (Seattle, Washington: University of Seattle Press), 1993

External links

Historic Oregon Electric Railway images from Salem Public Library
Oregon Electrics  from www.pdxhistory.com

Former Class I railroads in the United States
History of transportation in Oregon
Defunct Oregon railroads
Transportation in Portland, Oregon
Predecessors of the Spokane, Portland and Seattle Railway
Railway companies established in 1906
Railway companies disestablished in 1981
Interurban railways in Oregon
Electric railways in Oregon
1906 establishments in Oregon
Historic American Engineering Record in Oregon